The twenty-third season of The Bachelor premiered on January 7, 2019. This season features 26-year-old Colton Underwood, a former professional football player and charity founder from Washington, Illinois.

Underwood finished in fourth place on the fourteenth season of The Bachelorette featuring Becca Kufrin, and also appeared on the fifth season of Bachelor in Paradise. The season concluded on March 12, 2019, with Underwood choosing to pursue a relationship with 23-year-old speech pathologist Cassie Randolph. Randolph was the first woman to win in the show's history after quitting in the same season. The couple announced their breakup on May 29, 2020. Underwood publicly came out as gay on April 14, 2021, making him the first lead in franchise history to publicly identify as gay.

Production

Casting and contestants
On September 4, 2018, during Good Morning America, Underwood was announced as the next Bachelor over Blake Horstmann and Jason Tartick, who are castmates with Underwood in The Bachelorette season 14. Horstmann would go on to be a contestant in season six of Bachelor in Paradise.

Three contestants were first introduced in The Ellen DeGeneres Show on September 20, 2018. On that show, Colton met Annie Reardon, Sydney Lotuaco, and Katie Morton in a game of Know or Go. Annie won the game and got to talk to Colton for longer than Sydney and Katie. The rest of the contestants were later revealed on the official Facebook page by Chris Harrison on December 6, 2018.

Notable contestants include beauty queens Caelynn Miller-Keyes, Hannah Brown and Hannah Godwin competed one against another in various beauty pageants. Miller-Keyes and Brown competed in Miss USA 2018, as Miss North Carolina USA and Miss Alabama USA, respectively; Miller-Keyes was placed as the first runner-up, Godwin had competed against Brown in Miss Alabama USA; and Catherine Agro is the twin sister of America's Next Top Model cycle 20 contestant Alexandra Agro.

Filming and development
This season featured a visit in Singapore. Besides Singapore, this season also included visits in Thailand, Vietnam, Portugal, the Bachelor's hometown of Denver, Colorado and Spain. The season also had special appearances from husband and wife comedians Megan Mullally and Nick Offerman, actor and comedian Billy Eichner, actor and former professional football player Terry Crews, The Bachelor Vietnam host Khôi Trần and singer Brett Young.

Contestants

This season began with 30 contestants.

Later appearances

The Bachelorette
Hannah Brown was chosen as the lead for season 15 of The Bachelorette'

Tayshia Adams was chosen to replace Clare Crawley as the lead in season 16 of The Bachelorette. Adams was named as the interim host for The Bachelorette in seasons 17 and 18 alongside season 11 Bachelorette Kaitlyn Bristowe, replacing Chris Harrison.

Bachelor in Paradise
Season 6

Hannah Godwin, Tayshia Adams, Caelynn Miller-Keyes, Demi Burnett, Jane Averbukh, Katie Morton, Nicole Lopez-Alvar, Onyeka Ehie, Sydney Lotuaco, Bri Barnes, Caitlin Clemmens, Revian Chang, and Tahzjuan Hawkins returned for the sixth season of Bachelor in Paradise. Averbukh was eliminated in week 1. Ehie quit in week 2. Clemmens and Hawkins were eliminated in week 3. Miller-Keyes left with Dean Unglert in week 5. Lotuaco and Chang were eliminated in week 5. Barnes and Adams split from Matt Donald and John Paul Jones, respectively, in week 6. Godwin, Burnett, and Morton ended the season engaged to Dylan Barbour, Kristian Haggerty and Chris Bukowski, respectively.

Season 7

Hawkins and Burnett returned for the seventh season of Bachelor in Paradise. Hawkins quit in Week 2. Burnett was eliminated in week 3.

Bachelor in Paradise Canada

Clemmens returned for the inaugural season of Bachelor in Paradise Canada. She split from her partner Kamil Nicalek during week 5.

Dancing with the Stars
Outside of Bachelor Nation franchise, Brown was chosen for the twenty-eighth season of Dancing with the Stars. She went on to win with her partner, Alan Bersten.

The Bachelor
Brown appeared in two episodes in season 24 of The Bachelor. In addition, Heather Martin attempted to join the cast of season 25 of The Bachelor. Cassie Randolph made a guest appearance during the season 26 finale of The Bachelor. Tahzjuan Hawkins attempted to join the season 27 cast.

Beyond the Edge
Underwood competed in the first season of Beyond the Edge where he was crowned the winner.

Coming Out Colton
In 2021, after publicly coming out as gay, Underwood starred in an unscripted, six-episode Netflix documentary series titled Coming Out Colton''. In the series, Ehie made an appearance in the sixth episode.

Call-out order

 The contestant received the first impression rose
 The contestant received a rose during the date
 The contestant was eliminated
 The contestant was eliminated outside the rose ceremony
 The contestant was eliminated during the date
 The contestant quit the competition
 The contestant won the competition

Episodes

Controversies

Tracy Shapoff Twitter content
Shortly after the announcement of this season's contestants, one of the contestants, Tracy Shapoff, came under fire for her offensive posts on Twitter, bashing reality dating shows and using offensive language, dating back from 2009 to 2011. Shapoff later apologized for her comments on Instagram.

Notes

References

External links

2019 American television seasons
The Bachelor (American TV series) seasons
Television shows filmed in California
Television shows filmed in Singapore
Television shows filmed in Thailand
Television shows filmed in Vietnam
Television shows filmed in Colorado
Television shows filmed in Virginia
Television shows filmed in Alabama
Television shows filmed in Portugal
Television shows filmed in Spain